This is a list of events and standings for the Professional Fighters League, a mixed martial arts organization based in the United States, for the 2023 season.

2023 World champions

PFL Challenger Series 

PFL Challenger Series is an American mixed martial arts promotion. Young and up-and-coming male and female MMA prospects will compete for a slot in the PFL tournament season and a chance at $1 million. Each week, the PFL Challenger Series will consist of a celebrity guest panel featuring personalities in film, athletics, and music. The PFL Challenger Series will debut on fuboTV. The eight events will stream on consecutive Friday nights starting Feb. 18, and run through March. It will also air on its linear network, Fubo Sports Network.

2023 Contract Winners:

 HW: Abraham Bably, Denzel Freeman
 LHW: Impa Kasanganay
 WW: Thad Jean
 LW: Elvin Espinoza
 FW: Brahyan Zurcher
 W FW: Amanda Leve
 W FLY: Desiree Yanez

PFL Europe 
Starting in 2023 PFL Europe will feature the top emerging European MMA fighters, and will be broadcast during prime local hours with all events staged in Europe. The format will follow the same as the regular PFL Season, with the winner receiving a $100,000 prize and a chane to earn a spot in the 2024 PFL regular season.

Light Heavyweight

Women's Flyweight

Events 
The PFL 2023 season will start off with three shows planned in Las Vegas, Nevada, making a return to the city for the first time in three years. The first show will air on April 1, 2023, with the two subsequent shows airing on the Fridays afterward, on April 7th and 14th.

Standings
The PFL points system is based on results of the match.  The winner of a fight receives 3 points.  If the fight ends in a draw, both fighters will receive 1 point. A no-contest will be scored as a draw.  The bonus for winning a fight in the first, second, or third round is 3 points, 2 points, and 1 point respectively. The bonus for winning in the third round requires a fight be stopped before 4:59 of the third round.  No bonus point will be awarded if a fighter wins via decision.  For example, if a fighter wins a fight in the first round, then the fighter will receive 6 total points. A decision win will result in three total points.  If a fighter misses weight, the opponent (should they comply with weight limits) will receive 3 points due to a walkover victory, regardless of winning or losing the bout, with the fighter who missed weight being deducted 1 standings point;  if the non-offending fighter subsequently wins with a stoppage, all bonus points will be awarded. A fighter who was unable to compete for any reason, will receive a 1-point
penalty (-1 point in the standings). The fighters who made weight will not receive a walkover, but will earn points and contracted purse amounts based on their performance in the altered matchup.

Heavyweight

Light Heavyweight

Welterweight

Lightweight

Featherweight

Women's Featherweight

See also 

 List of PFL events
 List of current PFL fighters
 2023 in UFC
 2023 in Bellator MMA
 2023 in ONE Championship
 2023 in Absolute Championship Akhmat
 2023 in Konfrontacja Sztuk Walki
 2023 in Rizin Fighting Federation
 2023 in AMC Fight Nights
 2023 in Brave Combat Federation
 2023 in Road FC
 2023 in Eagle Fighting Championship
 2023 in Legacy Fighting Alliance

References 

2023
PFL